Monlong is a commune in the Hautes-Pyrénées department in south-western France.

Monlong is a small village in the Hautes-Pyrénées area of the Occitanie. The mayor, Michelle Castes, has been very active in building the profile of the village in the region as it sits on the main D929 that runs from Lannemezan up to Auch. The village has a post office and a chambres d'hote, La Cassoulere.

See also
Communes of the Hautes-Pyrénées department

References

Communes of Hautes-Pyrénées